A food processor is a kitchen appliance used to facilitate repetitive tasks in the preparation of food. Today, the term almost always refers to an electric-motor-driven appliance, although there are some manual devices also referred to as "food processors".

Food processors are similar to blenders in many forms. A food processor typically requires little to no liquid during use, and even its finely chopped products retain some texture. A blender, however, requires a set amount of liquid in order for the blade to properly blend the food, and its output is also more liquidy. Food processors are used to blend, chop, dice, and slice, allowing for quicker meal preparation.

History
One of the first electric food processors was the Starmix, introduced by German company Electrostar in 1946. Although the basic unit resembled a simple blender, numerous accessories were available, including attachments for slicing bread, milk centrifuges and ice cream bowls. In a time when electric motors were expensive, they also developed the piccolo, where the food processor's base unit could drive a vacuum cleaner. In the 1960s, Albrecht von Goertz designed the Starmix MX3 food processor. Although the entire company was rebranded as Starmix in 1968 following the success of the processors, they later focused on vacuum cleaners and electric hand-dryers and the last mixer was produced around the year 2000. 
In France, the concept of a machine to process food began when a catering company salesman, Pierre Verdun, observed the large amount of time his clients spent in the kitchen chopping, shredding and mixing. He produced a simple but effective solution, a bowl with a revolving blade in the base. In 1960, this evolved into Robot-Coupe, a company established to manufacture commercial "food processors" for the catering industry. In the late 1960s, a commercial food processor driven by a powerful commercial induction motor was produced. Robot-Coupe's Magimix food processor arrived from France in the UK in 1974, beginning with the Model 1800. Then, a UK company Kenwood Limited started their own first Kenwood Food Processor, 'processor de- luxe,' in 1979.

Carl Sontheimer introduced this same Magimix 1800 food processor to North America in 1973 under the Cuisinart brand, as America's first domestic food processor. Sontheimer contracted with a Japanese manufacturer to produce new models in 1977 in order to immediately launch his new Japanese-made food processor in 1980 when his contract with Robot-Coupe expired.

Marc Harrison's Cuisinart Re-design 
Disability research was an ongoing project because the first food processor created was not user friendly for all individuals. In 1978, Marc Harrison was a professor at the  Rhode Island School of Design. He specialized in Industrial Design. Cuisinart, an American company, contacted and hired Harrison in 1978 to update the Food Processor. Harrison updated the product to focus on making the machine usable for those with limited abilities with fine motor skills and eyesight, which in turn made it easier for any user to operate. These updates included larger writing on the base of the product to benefit those who have vision impairments, and larger handles and buttons.  These updates were created so that the food processor could be accessible for all users.

Functions
Food processors normally have multiple functions, depending on the placement and type of attachment or blade. Some of the more challenging tasks include kneading stiff doughs, chopping raw carrots, and shredding a hard cheese, which may require a more powerful motor. Accessories such as blender and juicer attachments may allow a food processor to perform the duties of other appliances.

Design and operation
The base of the unit houses a motor which turns a vertical shaft. A bowl, usually made of transparent plastic, fits around the shaft. Cutting blades can be attached to the shaft; these fit so as to operate near the bottom of the bowl. Shredding or slicing disks can be attached instead; these spin near the top of the bowl. A lid with a "feed tube" is then fitted onto the bowl.

The feed tube allows ingredients to be added while chopping or slicing. It also serves as a chute through which items are introduced to shredding or slicing disks. A "pusher" is provided, sized to slide through the feed tube, protecting the user's fingers.

Almost all modern food processors have safety devices which prevent the motor from operating if the bowl is not properly secured to the base or if the lid is not properly secured to the bowl.

Variations 
A food chopper is basically a food processor of a smaller size. It is also better suited for chopping food than making smoothies.

See also
Blade grinder
Blender
Bread machine
Coffee grinder
Electric pressure cooking
Food processing
 Ultrasonic homogenizer
Grater, a non-electric kitchen cutting implement
Home robot
Mandoline, a kitchen cutting device that uses similar styles of blades to some food processors
Multicooker
Donvier

References

External links

 Howstuffworks "How Food Processors Work"

Food preparation appliances
Garde manger
Products introduced in 1946
20th-century inventions
German inventions